Jordan Belfi  is an American actor. He is best known for his work on HBO's Entourage, in which he plays agent Adam Davies, the nemesis of Ari Gold (Jeremy Piven).

Early life
Belfi was born in California and graduated from Wesleyan University in 2000.

Career
Belfi also had a recurring guest star role in the CBS series Moonlight, starring as the female lead's boyfriend.

Belfi also appeared briefly in the Gilmore Girls Season 5 episode "The Party's Over". He also guest starred on Hawaii Five-0 as Spenser Owens in Season 1 Episode 14 "He Kane Hewa' Ole." In 2012, he guest starred on two episodes of Grey's Anatomy as Nick during season 8.

Belfi had a role on HBO's Entourage, in which he played agent Adam Davies, the nemesis of Ari Gold (Jeremy Piven). On the show, Davies betrays Ari at his old agency, giving away Ari's secret effort to build his own firm. Belfi appears semi-regularly over seasons 1 and 2, and made a single appearance in season 3, and two appearances in season 5. He is well recognized for Entourage (2004), All American (2018), and Grey's Anatomy (2005).

Personal life 
Belfi has been married to actress and producer Rachelle Dimaria since 2018. In June 2021, the couple announced that they are expecting their first child. Their son was born on December 1, 2021.

Film and Television

References

External links

1978 births
Wesleyan University alumni
American male television actors
Living people
Male actors from Los Angeles
21st-century American male actors
20th-century American male actors
American male film actors